Suck Creek is an unincorporated community in Hamilton and Marion Counties, in the U.S. state of Tennessee.

History
Suck Creek was named for the conditions in the Tennessee River which posed a hazard to pioneer travelers.

References

Unincorporated communities in Marion County, Tennessee
Unincorporated communities in Tennessee